John Calderwood McLean (30 March 1908 – 2 April 1988) was a professional footballer who played in the Football League as a centre half for Blackburn Rovers and Bristol Rovers.

Born in Busby, East Renfrewshire, McLean's first club was Scottish side Kirkintilloch Rob Roy, from where he joined Blackburn in 1930, and played eight times for them in the Football League First Division. In 1933 he signed for Bristol Rovers and was an ever-present in their team for his first two seasons with the club, picking up the Division Three (South) Cup in 1935. He went on to make 134 league appearances for Bristol Rovers, scoring once, before leaving to become player-manager of Street in 1938.

Street released McLean in 1939 following the outbreak of World War II, but he returned to management in 1945, taking charge of Bristol Rovers' Colts team for a single season. He continued living in Bristol for the remainder of his life, dying three days after his 80th birthday in 1988.

Sources

1908 births
1988 deaths
People from Busby, East Renfrewshire
Scottish footballers
Association football central defenders
English Football League players
Blackburn Rovers F.C. players
Bristol Rovers F.C. players
Kirkintilloch Rob Roy F.C. players
Sportspeople from East Renfrewshire
Scottish Junior Football Association players